The units of the Kenya Army Infantry are the principal fighting arms of the Kenya Army. The primary mission of the Infantry formations is to fight and win land battles within area of operational responsibilities in the defence of the nation against land – based aggression, while the secondary mission is the provision of aid and support to civil authorities in the maintenance of order. The Kenya School of Infantry (SOI) is located in Isiolo County.

History
In the early 1960s 3rd, 5th, and 11th Battalions of the King's African Rifles (KAR) were based at Nanyuki, Gilgil (in the same town as 3rd Regiment Royal Horse Artillery, which was at Alanbrooke Barracks) and Nairobi (Langata) in rotation.

Timothy Parsons writes:
'..Kenyan political elites viewed the army as a potential source of political leverage. No party or ethnic group was willing to let its rivals gain a dominant position in the armed forces. As a result, veteran askaris worried that politically connected soldiers would replace them. Most of the "martial races" that comprised the old colonial forces were not part of the Kenya African National Union [KANU], and many Kikuyu openly referred to the KAR as the "KADU army." In 1959, the Kalenjin, Kamba, Samburu, and Northern Frontier pastoral communities supplied approximately 77 percent of the total strength of the Kenyan KAR battalions.'

As the country prepared for independence in 1962–63 the National Assembly of Kenya passed a bill (Kenya Bills 1963) to amend the status of Kenyan military forces. Accordingly, former KAR units of them were transformed into Kenyan military forces and the newly independent Kenyan Government was legally empowered to assign names to them. This took effect from the time of the independence ceremonies, midnight, 12 December 1963. Thus 3 KAR, 5 KAR, and 11 KAR became 3 Kenya Rifles, 5 Kenya Rifles, and 11 Kenya Rifles.

Army mutinies in Tanganyika and Uganda in January 1964 set the stage for the unrest that took place within the Kenya Rifles. Faced with many of the same problems that confronted Kenyan soldiers, Tanganyika Rifles and Ugandan soldiers won improved
pay and the dismissal of expatriate British officers by threatening their newly sovereign politicians with violence. On the evening of 24 January 1964, the failure of the Kenyan Prime Minister to appear on television, where 11th Kenya Rifles junior soldiers had been expecting a televised speech and hoping for a pay rise announcement, caused the men to mutiny. Parsons says it is possible that the speech was only broadcast on the radio in the Nakuru area where Lanet Barracks, home of the battalion, was located. Kenyatta's government held two separate courts-martial for 43 soldiers.

In the aftermath of the mutiny and following courts-martial, the 11th Kenya Rifles was disbanded. A new battalion, 1st Kenya Rifles, was created entirely from 340 Lanet soldiers who had been cleared of participation in the mutiny by the Kenyan Criminal Investigations Division (CID).

Battalions of the Kenya Rifles 

1st Kenya Rifles Battalion – Nanyuki. Lieutenant K.A. Webi of 1 Kenya Rifles, who was commissioned into the Kenya Army in May 2009, died in the line of duty on 22 January when his unit conducted a raid on al Shabaab camps in Delbiyow and Hosingow.
3rd Kenya Rifles Battalion – Lanet Barracks, Nakuru. Another officer who was injured on 22 January 2012 incident and had been undergoing treatment at the hospital, Lieutenant Edward Okoyo attached to the 3rd Kenya Rifles, also later died. He had only served for one-and-a-half years. He had been commissioned into the KDF on 30 June 2010. Four AK-47 rifles, a large amount of ammunition, communication equipment and a collapsible water tank were recovered during the raid in which 11 al-Shabaab fighters were reportedly killed.
5th Kenya Rifles – Gilgil
7 Kenya Rifles – Langata Barracks, Nairobi. It was formed in 1969 and was previously located at Gilgil in a camp formerly held by British Army troops (possibly 3rd Regiment Royal Horse Artillery which had left five years earlier). The first task of the unit was to clean and repair the camp. The battalion moved to Langata in 1973.
9 Kenya Rifles – Moi Barracks, Eldoret. It was formed on 1 September 1979. The original troops of the battalion were drawn from other existing infantry units such as the 3rd, 5th, and 7th Kenya Rifles Battalion.  President Daniel arap Moi presented it with its colours on 12 December 1980. The first Commanding officer of the unit was Lt Col Daniel Opande. The unit has annually trooped its colours on Jamhuri Day since 2001. It took part in Exercise Natural Fire in 2006. The 9th Battalion Kenya Rifles mounted a guard of honour in honour the 12th Parliament Opening on 12 September 2017.
15 Battalion Kenya Rifles (15 KR), nicknamed the One five, was the seventh infantry battalion in the Kenya Army. It was formed on 13 March 1989. The unit was conceived as a Kenya contingent for dispatch to the United Nations Transitional Assistance Group (UNTAG) in Namibia circa 1990. On return from the UNTAG mission the unit was constituted as a fully fledged infantry unit, to be based in the outskirts of the coastal city of Mombasa at Mariakani Barracks.
At the time of the Battle of Kulbiyow (27 January 2017) against Al Shabaab, the Kulbiyow base in Jubaland, Somalia, was held by 250 Kenyan and Somali soldiers. The core of the base garrison was formed by C Company, 15 KR of 120 men, organized into four platoons. The Kenyan company also included a howitzer battery as well as several mortars.

17 Kenya Rifles – previously based at Nyali, Mombasa, and popularly known as the Desert Rangers due to their unit colour being desert brown. They received their presidential colours during the 55th Jamhuri Day celebrations on 12 December 2018, and relocated to their new home in Modika, Garissa County. 17 Battalion has served on the Kenyan Coast, in North Eastern, and several times with the African Union Mission in Somalia (tours AMISOM III, V and VI in 2014, 2016 and 2017). Standard Media relayed the KDF saying that the 'combat team [had] neutralised an Al-Shabaab camp at Hagar, 50 kilometres North East of Afmadhow".
19 Kenya Rifles – established in 2013 [or 28 June 2011?], the battalion was founded most recently. It is currently located in Nanyuki, and is popularly known as the Ash Warriors.

Casualties in Somalia 
Raymond Kirui, attached to 7 Kenya Rifles, who joined the Kenya Defence Forces on 25 October 2010, died on 24 November, last year when the vehicle he and 13 other soldiers were travelling in drove over an improvised explosive device in Bulla Garaay area near Mandera. Lance Corporal Willie Njoroge attached to the 1st Kenya Rifles died during a confrontation between his unit and al Shabaab fighters in Somalia on 29 December last year. His unit had raided the al Qaeda linked insurgents base south of Beles Qooqani when he was killed. Five al Shabaab fighters were killed and many others injured during the incident. He joined the Kenya Defence Forces on 3 August 2002.

Others who have been killed are Yusuf Abdullah Korio, a private in the 15th Kenya Rifles. Korio joined the military in 1992 and died during combat on 22 December last year when during fighting between Tabda and Dhobley. Ronald Kipkemboi Kiptui, who joined the army on 29 October 2007 and was attached to the 7th Kenya Rifles, died on 3 December, last year.

Other infantry units 
There are three other infantry units in the Kenya Army that are not necessarily part of the Kenya Rifles; 20 Parachute Battalion, and the two special operations units, 30 Special Forces Battalion and 40 Ranger Strike Force Battalion,. These units make up the Army Special Operations Brigade (Kenya). 

In addition, 50th Air Cavalry Battalion is a unique unit flying Hughes 500s which may have some airmobile infantry capability.

References

Further reading

External links
T.F. Mills, https://web.archive.org/web/20071023110441/http://www.regiments.org/regiments/africaeast/regts/ke-rifle.htm – reports 75th Battalion KR, 1980–present
 www.standardmedia.co.ke/amp/counties/article/2000140356/police-identify-slain- Nyali barracks attack, 2014
 https://www.standardmedia.co.ke/amp/explainers/article/2001431645/jamhuri-day-trooping-of-the-colours -19 Battalion history

Military units and formations of Kenya
Infantry regiments
Military units and formations established in 1963
1963 establishments in Kenya